John Flowers, also known as "Jake", is an American former Negro league outfielder who played in the 1940s.

Flowers played for the New York Black Yankees from 1941 to 1943, and again in 1946. In 15 recorded games, he posted 17 hits and seven RBI in 43 plate appearances. Flowers served as a corporal in the US Army during World War II.

References

External links
 and Baseball-Reference Black Baseball Stats and Seamheads

Year of birth missing
Place of birth missing
New York Black Yankees players
Baseball outfielders
United States Army personnel of World War II
20th-century African-American people